Caliente Mountain is a mountain located in the Southern Coast Ranges of California and is a federally listed wilderness study area for more than 30 years. The mountain receives a little snowfall during the winter months.

See also
 List of highest points in California by county
 Highpointing

References

External links
 

Mountains of San Luis Obispo County, California
Bureau of Land Management areas in California
Mountains of Southern California